The Minister of Foreign Affairs is the minister of the Crown in the Canadian Cabinet who is responsible for overseeing the Government of Canada's international relations and is the lead minister responsible for Global Affairs Canada, though the minister of international trade leads on trade issues. In addition to Global Affairs Canada, the minister is also the lead in overseeing the International Centre for Human Rights and Democratic Development and the International Development Research Centre.

From 1909 to 1993, the office was called the Secretary of State for External Affairs. The first two secretaries of state for external affairs, from 1909 until 1912, (Charles Murphy under Sir Wilfrid Laurier and William James Roche under Sir Robert Borden) concurrently served as the Secretary of State for Canada. The two portfolios were permanently separated in 1912, and the external affairs portfolio was then held by the prime minister of Canada until 1946.

History
Ministers holding the external affairs and foreign affairs portfolios have sometimes played prominent international roles:

 Lester B. Pearson (a future prime minister) defused the Suez Crisis and established the United Nations Peacekeeping Forces and as a result received the 1957 Nobel Peace Prize.
 Joe Clark (a former prime minister) led opposition to South Africa's Apartheid system within the Commonwealth of Nations, against initial resistance from the British government of Margaret Thatcher.
 Lloyd Axworthy brought about the Ottawa Treaty, banning anti-personnel landmines in most countries of the world.

As in Pearson's case (and that of Louis St. Laurent, his predecessor), the portfolio can be a final stepping stone to the Prime Minister's Office. Until 1946, it was customary for the office to be held by the sitting prime minister. John Diefenbaker would hold the portfolio on two subsequent occasions.

Prior and subsequent diplomatic services

Lester Pearson is the only minister to have been a diplomat prior to their appointment. Pearson entered the Canadian foreign service in 1927 and rose to become Canadian ambassador to the United States from 1944 to 1946.

Paul Martin, Sr. served as Canadian High Commissioner to the United Kingdom after his retirement from active politics.  Following his defeat in the 2011 election, Lawrence Cannon has served as Canadian ambassador to France since 2012, while Stéphane Dion was named Canadian ambassador to the European Union and Germany immediately after leaving cabinet in 2017. Unlike Pearson, none were career diplomats.

List of ministers
Key:

References

External links
Department of Foreign Affairs: History: Introduction
Department of Foreign Affairs Canada

Foreign relations of Canada
Foreign Affairs